Dunrobin Castle railway station is a railway station on the Far North Line in Scotland, serving Dunrobin Castle near the village of Golspie in the Highland council area. ScotRail, who manage the station, operate all services.

History 
It was originally a private station for the castle, the seat of the Duke of Sutherland. The Arts and Crafts style waiting room was designed by L Bisset and constructed in 1902, and is a category B listed building.

It was described in the Railway Magazine:

The Duke of Sutherland has a beautiful private railway station. As is well known, his Grace owns a large proportion of the North of Scotland, and his famous seat of Dunrobin Castle in that district has its own station for the Duke and his household, called after the Castle, "Dunrobin." The station is one of those on the line of the Highland Railway, and lies between Brora and Golspie, in Sutherlandshire. The Duke has had the place made not only serviceable, but very picturesque in its design and finish.

The general outline seems to be that of a Swiss chalet, and this appearance is not lessened by the surrounding hilly district. The windows are latticed, and look very cosy, whilst all the waiting-rooms and other necessary adjuncts to such a station are well fitted up. With true patriotism his lordship determined that Scotch pine should be used as far as possible in the construction of his station, so that he had it built of that wood. Thus it is extremely strongly made, as it needs to be to resist the ravages of snow and wind that sweep so terribly across the Sutherland moors in winter.

As a rule the platforms of private stations are very small, but this one at Dunrobin is an exception. It is very long, for often the family at the Castle will entertain three or four hundred guests at a time, when important fêtes or events are taking place there.

Facilities 
The station has no facilities, save for a small waiting area and the old station buildings, including a privately-owned toilet - the northernmost station in Great Britain to have a toilet on the station platform.

Passenger volume 

The statistics cover twelve month periods that start in April.

Services 
It is open only during the summer when the castle itself is open, and is closed from late October to March every year. On weekdays and Saturdays, the station sees three trains each way, with one train towards Inverness on Sundays.

Cultural References 
The station was used in the 4th and 5th Harry Potter films as Hogsmeade. The station was also featured on an episode of Michael Portillo's Great British Railway Journeys in 2012, in which he opened the restored toilet in the former station buildings.

References

Bibliography

External links 

Railway stations in Sutherland
Railway stations in Great Britain opened in 1874
Railway stations in Great Britain closed in 1965
Railway stations in Great Britain opened in 1985
Former Highland Railway stations
Beeching closures in Scotland
Railway stations served by ScotRail
Category B listed buildings in Highland (council area)
Listed railway stations in Scotland
Railway request stops in Great Britain
Former private railway stations
Reopened railway stations in Great Britain
Laurie Bisset railway stations